Soubala  is a village and rural commune in the Cercle of Bankass in the Mopti Region of Mali. The commune contains 9 villages and in the 2009 census had a population of 12,332.

References

External links
.

Communes of Mopti Region